Omundaungilo is an electoral constituency in the Ohangwena Region of Namibia, on the border to Angola. It has 8,085 inhabitants in 2004 and 6,642 registered voters .

Politics
As is common in all constituencies of former Owamboland, Namibia's ruling SWAPO Party has dominated elections since independence. 

It won the 2015 regional election by a landslide. Its candidate Festus Ikanda gathered 3,012 votes, while the only opposition candidate, Jason Haufiku of the Rally for Democracy and Progress (RDP), received 89 votes. Councillor Ikanda of SWAPO was reelected in the 2020 regional election. He received 2,800 votes, far ahead of Lamek Nanghalu of the Independent Patriots for Change (IPC), an opposition party formed in August 2020, who obtained 287 votes.

References 

Constituencies of Ohangwena Region
States and territories established in 1992
1992 establishments in Namibia